Robinson Garcia Tejeda (born March 24, 1982) is a Dominican former professional baseball pitcher. He played in Major League Baseball (MLB) for the Philadelphia Phillies, Texas Rangers  and Kansas City Royals.

Baseball career

Philadelphia Phillies
Tejeda was first signed as an amateur free agent by the Philadelphia Phillies on November 24, . He made his professional debut the following year with the GCL Phillies.

In , Tejeda made the jump to the major league club. Starting with his debut against the Milwaukee Brewers on May 10, 2005, he appeared in 26 games – half of those as a starter.

Tejeda was a former member of the Dominican Republic team in the 2006 World Baseball Classic. He only made two appearances during the tournament, a shutout inning against Australia and a rough ninth-inning appearance in the Dominican Republic's first game against Cuba.

Texas Rangers
Just prior to the start of the  season, Tejeda was dealt by the Phillies to the Texas Rangers along with Jake Blalock (the brother of free agent third baseman Hank Blalock) in exchange for outfielder David Dellucci. He started the season with the Triple-A Oklahoma RedHawks, but was called up to the Rangers at the end of April. His first outings were shaky, and he was quickly reassigned back to Oklahoma. Aside from an emergency call-up in June, Tejeda stayed with the RedHawks until he was recalled for good in mid-August. Tejeda was in excellent form for the latter third of the season, going 4-1 over eight starts, with an ERA of 2.01.

Tejeda earned a spot in the starting rotation for the  season, but poor performance in July resulted in his demotion back to Triple-A.

Kansas City Royals
On June 24, the Kansas City Royals claimed Tejeda off waivers from the Rangers.

Tejeda throws a quality fastball (96 mph) and changeup, and is developing a useful curveball.
 
In spring training in 2009, Tejeda led all players in walks, with 17 (in 17.1 innings).

On May 26, 2011, Tejeda was designated for assignment by the Royals. He elected free agency after the season on October 7.

Cleveland Indians
On January 3, 2012, Tejeda signed a minor league contract with the Cleveland Indians. He also received an invitation to spring training. Tejeda was released by the Indians' organization on May 16, 2012.

Mexican League
On July 4, 2013, Tejeda signed with the Rojos del Águila de Veracruz of the Mexican League.

Independent leagues
Tejada signed with the Joplin Blasters of the American Association of Independent Professional Baseball.

References

External links

1982 births
Living people
Arizona League Rangers players
Azucareros del Este players
Clearwater Phillies players
Columbus Clippers players
Dominican Republic expatriate baseball players in Mexico
Dominican Republic expatriate baseball players in the United States
Florida Complex League Phillies players
Kansas City Royals players
Lakewood BlueClaws players
Major League Baseball pitchers
Major League Baseball players from the Dominican Republic
Mexican League baseball pitchers
Northwest Arkansas Naturals players
Oklahoma RedHawks players
Omaha Royals players
Omaha Storm Chasers players
People from Baní
Philadelphia Phillies players
Reading Phillies players
Rojos del Águila de Veracruz players
Scranton/Wilkes-Barre Red Barons players
Texas Rangers players
Tigres del Licey players
Toros del Este players
World Baseball Classic players of the Dominican Republic
2006 World Baseball Classic players